Qinhuangdao is a port city on the coast of China in northern Hebei. Its population during the 2020 national census was 3,136,879, with 1,881,047 people living in the built-up (or 'metro') area made up of 4 urban districts.

History
The city's name "Qinhuangdao" literally means "Qin Emperor island", and is allegedly originated from the legend that the Jieshishan Scenic Area in Changli County was the site of First Emperor of Qin's famous ritual during his fourth and final survey tour to the east (东巡) in 210 BC. The "island" refers to the Nanshan area of the Port of Qinhuangdao at the southern edge of the city's Haigang District, which used to be a small offshore island until the late Qing dynasty, when dumping of dredged silt joined it to the mainland after the Guangxu Emperor approved the port's construction in the late 19th century.

In the 19th century, Qinhuangdao included the separate towns of Qinhuangdao and Tanghe. Both were stations along the Peking–Mukden Railway. The design and construction of the new harbour and port of Ching Wang Tao in the Gulf of Pechili was undertaken by the partnership of Sir John Wolfe-Barry and Lt Col Arthur John Barry at the turn of the 20th century.

At the beginning of the Chinese Civil War, Du Yuming's National Revolutionary Army forces landed in the city at the beginning of the Nationalist government's offensive against the Chinese Communist Party in Soviet-occupied Manchuria. They were unable to land further north because other ports were either occupied by the Soviet Union or already garrisoned by the military forces which would become the People's Liberation Army.

Qinhuangdao Olympic Sports Center Stadium was used as one of the soccer venues during the 2008 Summer Olympics.

Geography
Qinhuangdao sits on the northwest coast of the Bohai Sea and borders Tangshan to the southwest, Chengde to the northwest, and Liaoning to the northeast.

Since the elevation of Tianjin to a provincial-level municipality, Qinhuangdao is the chief port of Hebei. The Qin emperor Qin Shi Huang is said to have sought immortality on an island in Haigang District but did not find it.

Qinhuangdao has three main developed areas:
 Beidaihe: A summer seaside resort for senior government officials. Many political decisions affecting China are made here, making it the equivalent to resorts in Maine or Camp David in Maryland, United States.
 Haigang: the harbor city. Qinhuangdao proper. Home of Yan Shan University, the leading university in NE Hebei province.
 Shanhaiguan: a popular tourist destination, featuring the eastern end of the Great Wall.

Qinhuangdao's Olympic Sports Centre Stadium was used as an Olympic Competition Venue (Football Preliminary) during the 2008 Summer Olympics.

Climate
Qinhuangdao has a monsoon-influenced humid continental climate (Köppen Dwa), with four distinct seasons. As measured by daily mean temperature, July and August are equally warm, averaging .

Administrative divisions

Development Zone
The Qinhuangdao Economic & Technology Development Zone was approved by the State Council of the People's Republic of China in 1984 to become one of China's first state-level economic and technological development zones. Qinhuangdao is in the heart of the rapidly growing "Bohai-Rim Economic Circle", in easy reach of Beijing and Tianjin. The planned and controlled area of the development zone has reached . By the end of 2006, the number of approved projects reached 4,546, in which 647 projects were foreign-invested, with a total investment of US$4.73 billion.

Qinhuangdao Export Processing Zone is the first export processing zone in Hebei Province. It passed joint appraisal held by the General Administration of Customs, the State Development Planning Commission, and other six departments in 2003. Industries encouraged in the zone include electronics assembly and manufacturing, building/construction materials, computer software, trading and distribution.

Economy

Qinhuangdao Port is a strategically important port and is the largest coal shipping port in the country, much of which is shipped to power plants elsewhere in China. With recent expansion, its capacity has reached 209 million metric tons. The harbor is adding a further six berths to add capacity and is increasingly being invested in by other port operators, such as South Africa's Port of Richards Bay, who have announced plans to invest US$150 million to increase capacity by at least 28 percent.

China is the world's third largest coal exporter, and Qinhuangdao is expected to handle much of the nation's coal exports. Rail links from Shanxi (China's largest coal producer) to Qinhuangdao Port are being upgraded, which should allow for Qinhuangdao to ultimately increase its throughput to 400 million tonnes of coal per annum from its current level of about 250 million tons by 2015. 

Other Chinese and foreign service suppliers are moving to Qinhuangdao to support this. China Ocean Shipping (Group) Co, China's biggest shipping company, expects US$49 billion of spending on ports over the next five years as the industry tackles bottlenecks created by the nation's unprecedented economic boom.

Qinhuangdao is on the Jingshen Expressway which links Beijing with Shenyang, Liaoning.

The city is served by Qinhuangdao Beidaihe Airport.

Tourism
The Qinhuangdao Wildlife Park was opened in 1995 and is China's second largest wildlife park.

Red Ribbon

Qinhuangdao is home to the Tanghe River Park, which features the Red Ribbon, a knee-high steel sculpture that runs the length of the park, providing seating, environmental interpretation, lighting, and the display of native plants. The project has won an honor award from the American Society of Landscape Architects and was selected by readers of Condé Nast Traveler magazine as one of the seven new wonders of the architecture world.

Education
 Yanshan University
 Northeastern University at Qinhuangdao 
 Hebei Institute of International Business and Economics
 Hebei Normal University of Science and Technology
 Northeastern Petroleum University at Qinhuangdao

Sister cities
  Lugo, Galicia, Spain
  Pesaro, Marche, Italy
  Toledo, Ohio, United States, since 1985
  Honolulu, Hawaii, United States, since May 5, 2010
  Terrace, British Columbia, Canada, since November 30, 2015

Notes

References

External links
Qinhuangdao Government Online
Historic US Army map of Qinghuangdao and Beidaihe, 1944

 
Cities in Hebei
Prefecture-level divisions of Hebei